Janne Koponen (born June 7, 1995) is a Finnish ice hockey defenceman currently playing for IPK of the Mestis.

Koponen previously played eleven games for KalPa during the 2016–17 Liiga season before joining IPK in 2017.

Career statistics

References

External links

1995 births
Living people
Finnish ice hockey defencemen
Iisalmen Peli-Karhut players
KalPa players
People from Kuopio
Sportspeople from North Savo